Hartig is a German surname. Notable people with the surname include:

Hartig Drug, a chain of pharmacy retail stores based out of Dubuque, Iowa
Friedrich Hartig (1900–1980), an Italian  entomologist who specialised in Lepidoptera
Georg Ludwig Hartig (1764–1837), a German agriculturist and writer on forestry
Heinz Friedrich Hartig (1907–1969), a German composer and harpsichordist
Iulian Hartig (born 1998), a Romanian rugby union player
Lukáš Hartig (born 1976), a Czech football player
Robert Hartig  (1839–1901), a German forestry scientist and mycologist, son of Theodor
Theodor Hartig (1805–1880), a German forestry scientist and zoologist, son of Georg Ludwig

See also
Austrian nobility
List of counts of Austria-Hungary

German-language surnames